Up Somborne is a hamlet in the civil parish of King's Somborne in the Test Valley district of Hampshire, England.

The Grade II* listed 16th century Rookley Manor lies within the parish.

Villages in Hampshire
Test Valley